Sun Chao (born January 23, 1983 in Tianjin) is a female Chinese foil fencer, who competed at the 2008 Summer Olympics.

Major performances
2007 World Cup Shanghai - 7th
2007 World Cup Grand Prix Cuba - 2nd team

See also
China at the 2008 Summer Olympics

References

1983 births
Living people
Chinese female fencers
Fencers at the 2008 Summer Olympics
Olympic fencers of China
Fencers from Tianjin
21st-century Chinese women